German submarine U-544 was a Type IXC U-boat of Nazi Germany's Kriegsmarine during World War II.

She was laid down at the Deutsche Werft (yard) in Hamburg as yard number 365 on 8 July 1942, launched on 17 February 1943 and commissioned on 5 May with Korvettenkapitän Willy Mattke in command.

U-544 began her service career with training as part of the 4th U-boat Flotilla from 5 May 1943. She was reassigned to the 10th flotilla for operations on 1 November.

She carried out one patrol and did not sink any ships. She was a member of five wolfpacks.

She was sunk on 16 January 1944 northwest of the Azores by American aircraft.

Design
German Type IXC/40 submarines were slightly larger than the original Type IXCs. U-544 had a displacement of  when at the surface and  while submerged. She had two shafts and two  propellers.

U-544 was fitted with six  torpedo tubes (four fitted at the bow and two at the stern), 22 torpedoes, one  SK C/32 naval gun, 180 rounds, and a  SK C/30 as well as a  C/30 anti-aircraft gun. The boat had a complement of forty-eight.

Service history

Patrol and loss
The boat departed Kiel on 9 November 1943, moved through the North Sea, negotiated the 'gap' between Iceland and the Faroe Islands and entered the Atlantic Ocean.

She was sunk on 16 January 1944 northwest of the Azores by American aircraft from the escort carrier  using rockets and depth charges.

Fifty-seven men died; there were no survivors.

Wolfpacks
U-544 took part in five wolfpacks, namely:
 Coronel (4 – 8 December 1943) 
 Coronel 1 (8 – 14 December 1943) 
 Coronel 2 (14 – 17 December 1943) 
 Föhr (18 – 23 December 1943) 
 Rügen 6 (26 – 31 December 1943)

References

Bibliography

External links

German Type IX submarines
U-boats commissioned in 1943
U-boats sunk in 1944
World War II submarines of Germany
1943 ships
World War II shipwrecks in the Atlantic Ocean
Ships built in Hamburg
U-boats sunk by depth charges
U-boats sunk by US aircraft
Ships lost with all hands
Maritime incidents in January 1944